Garfield McConnell Langhorn (September 10, 1948 – January 15, 1969) was a United States Army soldier and a recipient of America's highest military decoration—the Medal of Honor—for his actions in the Vietnam War.

Biography
Born on September 10, 1948, in Cumberland, Virginia, Langhorn was living in Brooklyn, New York, when he joined the U.S. Army. He served in Vietnam as a private first class and radio operator with Troop C, 7th Squadron (Airmobile), 17th Cavalry Regiment, 1st Aviation Brigade. On January 15, 1969, Langhorn's unit attempted to rescue the crew of a downed American helicopter near Plei Djereng in Pleiku Province, South Vietnam. After finding the crash site and the bodies of the dead crewmen, the unit turned back, only to be attacked by entrenched North Vietnamese forces. During the battle, Langhorn threw himself on an enemy hand grenade that had been thrown near several wounded soldiers. He was killed in the ensuing explosion, but succeeded in protecting the lives of his fellow soldiers.

Langhorn, aged 20 years at his death, was buried at Riverhead Cemetery in Riverhead, New York.

On September 27, 2010, the Riverhead, New York post office building was named the Private First Class Garfield M. Langhorn Post Office Building by the 111th United States Congress.

Military awards
Medal of Honor
Purple Heart
National Defense Service Medal
Vietnam Service Medal with campaign star
Republic of Vietnam Cross of Gallantry with palm
Republic of Vietnam Campaign Medal

Medal of Honor citation
Langhorn's official Medal of Honor citation reads:

For conspicuous gallantry and intrepidity in action at the risk of his life above and beyond the call of duty. Pfc. Langhorn distinguished himself while serving as a radio operator with Troop C, near Plei Djereng in Pleiku province. Pfc. Langhorn's platoon was inserted into a landing zone to rescue 2 pilots of a Cobra helicopter shot down by enemy fire on a heavily timbered slope. He provided radio coordination with the command-and-control aircraft overhead while the troops hacked their way through dense undergrowth to the wreckage, where both aviators were found dead. As the men were taking the bodies to a pickup site, they suddenly came under intense fire from North Vietnamese soldiers in camouflaged bunkers to the front and right flank, and within minutes they were surrounded. Pfc. Langhorn immediately radioed for help from the orbiting gunships, which began to place minigun and rocket fire on the aggressors. He then lay between the platoon leader and another man, operating the radio and providing covering fire for the wounded who had been moved to the center of the small perimeter. Darkness soon fell, making it impossible for the gunships to give accurate support, and the aggressors began to probe the perimeter. An enemy hand grenade landed in front of Pfc. Langhorn and a few feet from personnel who had become casualties. Choosing to protect these wounded, he unhesitatingly threw himself on the grenade, scooped it beneath his body and absorbed the blast. By sacrificing himself, he saved the lives of his comrades. Pfc. Langhorn's extraordinary heroism at the cost of his life was in keeping with the highest traditions of the military service and reflect great credit on himself, his unit, and the U.S. Army.

See also

 List of Medal of Honor recipients for the Vietnam War
 List of African-American Medal of Honor recipients

References

1948 births
1969 deaths
People from Cumberland County, Virginia
United States Army soldiers
American military personnel killed in the Vietnam War
United States Army Medal of Honor recipients
Vietnam War recipients of the Medal of Honor
Deaths by hand grenade
United States Army personnel of the Vietnam War